Worthington Springs is a spring and town in Union County, Florida, United States. The population was 181 at the 2010 census. According to the U.S. Census Bureau's 2018 estimates, the town had a population of 380.

History
The community was named for early settler Sam Worthington, who arrived prior to the first Seminole War of 1814–1819. The mineral spring on the Santa Fe River was alleged to have medicinal benefits, attracting people from the late 1800s to the early 1900s. In the early years, swimming was segregated, with men and women assigned specific time intervals. In 1906, the new owner constructed a 12'×12' concrete box around the spring to divert water into a 90'×50' concrete pool with a wall dividing the bathing area into sections for men and women. The complex included a hotel, recreation hall and bathhouse for the spring pool.  
 
Independence Day was always a big celebration at the springs. Thousands of people from surrounding communities would converge on the springs to picnic, swim, politic and converse with friends and fellow Floridians. A special train transported people from Jacksonville for the holiday festivities. 
An iron and timber bridge was built across the river in 1908, facilitating access to and from the south. It was replaced in 1937 with the present concrete structure.  
In the mid-twentieth century, the outflow from the spring declined, and then stopped flowing completely. Activity at the resort likewise curtailed, and the facility was abandoned. The area around the Santa Fe river is subject to periodic flooding, just as the flow at the spring varies widely. In 1972, flow was measured at 233,280 gallons per day.

Worthington Springs was incorporated in 1963 with a Mayor–council government.  Street lights were installed, and a playground was created in the town park. In 1975, a Community Center was built the included government offices for a City Hall.

Geography

Worthington Springs is located at  (29.933836, –82.424370).
The town is located along the Santa Fe River on the southern county line with Alachua.

Demographics

As of the census of 2000, there were 193 people, 70 households, and 52 families residing in the town. The racial makeup of the town was 89.64% White, 5.18% African American, 2.07% from other races, and 3.11% from two or more races. Hispanic or Latino of any race were 2.07% of the population.

There were 70 households, out of which 40.0% had children under the age of 18 living with them, 52.9% were married couples living together, 18.6% had a female householder with no husband present, and 25.7% were non-families. 20.0% of all households were made up of individuals, and 7.1% had someone living alone who was 65 years of age or older.  The average household size was 2.76 and the average family size was 3.08.

In the town, the age distribution of the population shows 31.6% under the age of 18, 11.4% from 18 to 24, 26.4% from 25 to 44, 19.2% from 45 to 64, and 11.4% who were 65 years of age or older.  The median age was 32 years. For every 100 females, there were 94.9 males.  For every 100 females age 18 and over, there were 91.3 males.

The median income for a household in the town was $25,625, and the median income for a family was $27,083. Males had a median income of $26,458 versus $14,750 for females. The per capita income for the town was $14,031.  About 21.4% of families and 22.3% of the population were below the poverty line, including 10.2% of those under the age of eighteen and 36.4% of those 65 or over.

References

Towns in Union County, Florida
Springs of Florida
Towns in Florida
Bodies of water of Union County, Florida